Nate Wozniak (born August 30, 1994) is a former American football offensive tackle. He played college football at Minnesota.

College career
At Minnesota, he primarily played tight end and caught 28 passes for 314 yards over the final three seasons of college.

Professional career

At Minnesota's Pro Day, Wozniak ran the 40-yard dash in 5.1 seconds, bench pressed 225 pounds 16 times and posted a 32-inch vertical leap.

New Orleans Saints
After going undrafted in the 2018 NFL Draft, Wozniak was signed by the New Orleans Saints on May 3, 2018, where he was eventually moved to offensive tackle. He was waived by the Saints on September 1, 2018, and was signed to the practice squad the next day. He signed a reserve/future contract with the Saints on January 21, 2019. He was waived on August 7, 2019.

Minnesota Vikings
On August 11, 2019, Wozniak was signed by the Minnesota Vikings. He was waived on August 31, 2019.

Atlanta Falcons
On September 17, 2019, Wozniak was signed to the Atlanta Falcons practice squad. He was released on September 26.

New Orleans Saints (second stint)
On December 4, 2019, Wozniak was signed to the New Orleans Saints practice squad. He was released on December 12.

New York Giants
On December 17, 2019, Wozniak was signed to the New York Giants practice squad. He signed a reserve/future contract with the Giants on December 30, 2019. He was placed on the reserve/retired list by the team on July 30, 2020.

References

External links
Minnesota bio

1994 births
Living people
American football offensive tackles
American football tight ends
Atlanta Falcons players
Minnesota Golden Gophers football players
Minnesota Vikings players
New Orleans Saints players
New York Giants players
People from Greenwood, Indiana
Players of American football from Indiana